Galo Carrera Hurtado (born 19 August 1953 in Mexico) is serving as an Honorary Consul of Mexico to Canada.  He is a research associate for marine affairs at Dalhousie University in Halifax, Canada, a visiting professor at the World Maritime University in Malmö, Sweden, and a Fellow of the International Association of Geodesy. He has authored and coauthored nearly 200 scientific articles and technical reports, and has presented papers and made scholarly addresses at international conferences, seminars and courses on five continents.

He is a veteran UN maritime demarcation expert in the Law of the Sea, and was in 2010 appointed the chairman of the UN Commission on the Limits of the Continental Shelf. He served as the secretary of the UN committee for Geodetic Aspects of the Law of the Sea (GALOS), as well as a member of the UN Advisory Board on the Law of the Sea (ABLOS).

He has been consulted by governments on matters concerning maritime delineation, so he acted as ministerial advisor to: Commonwealth Secretariat of United Kingdom, Department of Foreign Affairs of Philippines, National Boundary Commission of Nigeria, Ministry of Foreign Affairs of Oman, Executive Branch (COALEP) of Uruguay, Ministry of Lands and Resettlement of Namibia, Department of Foreign Affairs of Grenada, Ministry of Justice of Republic of Angola, Ministry of Foreign Affairs of Guyana, Department of Foreign Relations (SRE) of Mexico, Ministry of Foreign Affairs of Jamaica, Ministry of Land Use and Habitat of the Seychelles, South Pacific Forum Fisheries Agency of Solomon Islands, Foreign Ministry of Kingdom of Tonga, Maritime Agency of Sierra Leone, and Petroleum Directorate of the Province of Nova Scotia in Canada.

Besides his involvement in international maritime affairs, he has also acted as the special advisor in the 2002 inter-Canadian delineation case concerning right-of-access to marine oil reserves, between Newfoundland and Labrador on one side, and Nova Scotia on the other.

As a UN official, he has been involved in resolving maritime disputes such as the 2012 dispute between Taiwan, China and Japan.

In a 2013 WikiLeaks release of secret documents regarding possible oil access dispute between Venezuela and Guyana, the foreign minister of Guayana Carolyn Rodrigues wrote on her country's 2011 submission to the UN for extension of Guayana's continental shelf: "Dr. Carrera has worked hard and methodically to ensure that Guyana has the best submission possible and as the Minister of Foreign Affairs I wish to recognize his commitment and diligent work."

References

External links
 Professor Carrera university homepage, World Maritime University, Sweden.
 Galo H. Carrera (1984) Heights on a deforming earth. UNB Canada, 150pp.
 
 
 

1953 births
Mexican diplomats
Mexican officials of the United Nations
Law of the sea
Academic staff of the Dalhousie University
Canadian people of Mexican descent
Living people